Helmut Polensky (10 October 1915, Berlin – 6 November 2011, Saint-Tropez) was a German moto racer, racing driver and racing car constructor.

Life outside racing 

Polensky was the youngest of four sons. His father was an architect. After leaving school and finishing military service, he began a career as a professional motorcycle and auto racer. After the Second World War, he married. He spent the last decades of his life in Saint-Tropez.

The 1930s and the Second World War 

Polensky began racing motorcycles as a club racer in the mid-1930s.  In 1939, he switched to sports car racing, piloting a used BMW 328. The same year, he signed as an engineer apprentice with Auto Union, and also joined the National Socialist Motor Corps.

Polensky  spent the Second World War as a logistics specialist in Berlin. In 1945 he escaped from a Soviet prisoner of war camp, fleeing to Hamburg. He worked there in 1946 as managing director of a small motor company.

Racer and designer 

In 1947, Polensky returned to Berlin and in the ruins opened one of the first Vespa dealerships in Germany. He also began racing again, designing and in his own workshop constructing a Formula Three racer with a  motorcycle engine, akin to the Cooper 500. Polensky's first model was the Kurpfalz. This was followed by the Monopoletta, a BMW-powered monoposto. Polensky raced his Monopoletta throughout the late 1940s across West Germany. In 1950, he was fifth overall in the West German Formula Three Championship.

In the early the 1950s, Polensky began to concentrate increasingly on sports car races. He entered the Mille Miglia in 1952. His wife served as co-driver several times in the Tour de France. Around the same time, he moved his family to Karlsruhe, where he opened a Volkswagen dealership. Driving a Porsche, he won the 1953 Coupe des Alpes and European Rally Championship, coming first overall in the championship. He was also eighth overall at the 12 Hours of Reims in 1954.

Polensky entered the 24 Hours of Le Mans three times. In 1955, he was shared a Porsche 550 with journalist Richard von Frankenberg, coming  fourth overall and earning a class win. He also took the 21st Biennial Cup.

In 1956, Polensky quit racing to become a successful automobile dealer.

Le Mans results

Books 

 Christian Moity, Jean-Marc Teissèdre, Alain Bienvenu. 24 Heures du Mans, 1923-1992. Éditions d'Art, Besancon, 1992 .

External links 
 Biography of Helmut Polensky
 Race results

References 

1915 births
2011 deaths
Sportspeople from Berlin
German racing drivers
World Sportscar Championship drivers
German automobile designers
German motorsport people
National Socialist Motor Corps members
German prisoners of war in World War II held by the Soviet Union
German escapees
Escapees from Soviet detention
Porsche Motorsports drivers